Creative Planning is an independent wealth management firm and registered investment advisor majority owned by American financial advisor Peter Mallouk. The firm was founded in 1983 and is headquartered in Overland Park, Kansas. The company provides wealth management services for individuals, businesses and institutions, including investment management, financial planning, estate planning, tax planning, trust services, tax preparation and charitable giving services.

History 
Creative Planning was founded in 1983 in Overland Park, Kansas, a suburb of Kansas City, Missouri. Peter Mallouk acquired the company in 2004 after working for the firm for five years as an estate planner. Mallouk removed Creative Planning's dual registration so it could operate solely as an independent wealth management firm and registered investment advisor (RIA). At the time, the firm managed assets estimated at $34 million.

In 2015, Creative Planning was named #1 on the Top 100 Fee-Only Wealth Management Firms by CNBC. That same year Barron’s ranked Creative Planning #1 on their list of the Top RIA Firms.

By 2017, the company had grown its assets under management to $26.2 billion with advisers located in more than 30 states, and clients in all 50 US states.

In 2018, a $200,000 fine by the U.S. Securities and Exchange Commission against the firm was the result of a series of radio advertisements heard in live and pre-recorded broadcasts by a radio show host who was a client of the firm. The host gave testimonials for the firm in violation of the Investment Advisers Act of 1940. In addition to the fine, the firm was censured and agreed to a cease and desist order. Mallouk stated that he was unaware of the content of the ads. He was also fined $50,000 at the same time, for a failure to report investments by family members in the firm.

In 2020, the firm announced it would donate $12 million over 18 months to organizations that support social justice reform, access to education, financial literacy and basic needs.  In the same year, Creative Planning also donated $1 million to Kansas City-based Harvesters – The Community Food Network to provide food to those who are food insecure in northwestern Missouri and northeastern Kansas.

In 2021, the firm began offering key employees the opportunity to acquire equity in the company. As a result, 10% of employees (86 individuals) gained partial ownership in the firm. 

Also in 2021, Creative Planning launched Pathway Financial Education, a nonprofit organization that provides free financial education and training to small-business owners and other individuals in under-resourced communities. The Pathway Financial Education Center is located in the historic jazz district of 18th and Vine in Kansas City. 

In November 2021, Creative Planning announced that it surpassed $100 billion in assets under management.

Acquisitions 
In February 2019, the acquisition of The Johnston Group, a Minneapolis-based RIA with more than $500 million assets under management, was the first for the company. Creative Planning then acquired America’s Best 401k, a firm which manages in $1 billion in assets and specializes in low-fee model 401(k)s. OptiFour, which is based in McLean, Virginia, and manages $400 million in assets, was acquired in November 2019.

Stratford Consulting in Addison, Texas, was acquired January 2020, adding $618 million in assets under management. In February 2020, Creative Planning accepted its first outside capital when it sold a minority stake in the firm to General Atlantic, a private equity firm. Creative Planning then continued its buying spree by acquiring Coe Financial Services, an RIA in Wichita, Kansas, with $126 million in assets, in April 2020,   followed by Sunrise Advisors Inc., a Leawood, Kansas-based RIA,   in June 2020, adding $700 million in assets. The following month, Creative Planning acquired Starfire Investment Advisors in Southfield, Michigan adding $530 million in assets under management;  in August 2020 it acquired Lenox Wealth, a firm with $600 million in assets and based in Cincinnati, and Miller Investment Management, a local Overland Park firm managing more than $150 million in assets;  in September 2020 it acquired The Atlanta-based TrueWealth LLC, which manages more than $1.6 billion in assets .

By November 2020, Creative Planning had completed 11 acquisitions for a total of $7.2 billion in assets. In February 2021, the firm acquired the Northbrook, Illinois-based Iron Financial which manages $6 billion in assets. By acquiring the Indianapolis-based Castle Wealth Advisors with $320 million in assets in April 2021, Creative Planning also gained the ability to offer business valuation services. Around the same time, the firm helped start Pathway Financial Education, a nonprofit organization that offers free financial education in Kansas City and online with instructors from Creative Planning. In May 2021, the firm acquired another RIA based in McLean, Virginia, Sullivan Bruyette Speros & Blayney, which manages $5 billion in assets.

Operations 
In February 2017, Creative Planning began plans to move its headquarters from Leawood, Kansas, back to Overland Park. Since the move, the company has its headquarters located on a three-building campus on Interstate 435. As of April 2022, the company has 1250 employees. About 10% of the workforce began earning equity in the company in March 2021 when it began offering partnerships to its employees.

As of December 2021, Creative Planning has $225 billion in assets under management and advertisement.

References

External links 

 

Financial services companies established in 1983
Companies based in Kansas
Financial services companies of the United States
1983 establishments in Kansas
1983 establishments in the United States
Companies established in 1983